Theoxena is a monotypic moth genus in the family Geometridae erected by Edward Meyrick in 1883. Its only species, Theoxena scissaria, was first described by Achille Guenée in 1868. It is endemic to New Zealand. This species has been classified as nationally vulnerable by the Department of Conservation.

Taxonomy 
It was described by Guenée in 1868 from a specimen obtained in Canterbury by Richard William Fereday and named Panagra scissaria. In 1883 Edward Meyrick placed the species into the newly created genus Theoxena. In 1898 and in 1928 George Vernon Hudson also described and illustrated Theoxena scissaria. The lectotype specimen is held at the Natural History Museum, London.

Description 
Meyrick described the species as follows:

Distribution 
This species is endemic to New Zealand. Its range is in North Canterbury, Mid Canterbury, South Canterbury, Mackenzie, Central Otago and Otago Lakes. Other than the type locality, specimens have been collected near the foot of Mount Hutt, the Winchmore Irrigation Research Station near Ashburton, at the lower slopes of Mount Ida in Otago, Horseshoe Slip on Mount Grey, and Ashley Gorge. It is now possibly extinct on the Canterbury Plains.

Life cycle and behaviour 
The life history of T. scissaria is still uncertain. Adults have been collected in late winter at the foot of Mount Ida, though none were collected there after August. This species has also been recorded as being on the wing in June, December and January. It is most commonly seen between the months of May and July. A second generation emerges during the summer months. Although T. scissaria has been collected during the day, it is attracted to light.

Habitat 
This species frequents plains.

Host species
The host species of T. scissaria is as yet unknown. However, this species has been associated with the tussock grass Poa cita. It has been hypothesised that the host species for T. scissaria larvae may be in the genus Carmichaelia.

Conservation status 
This moth is classified under the New Zealand Threat Classification system as being nationally vulnerable.

References

Geometridae
Moths described in 1868
Moths of New Zealand
Endemic fauna of New Zealand
Taxa named by Achille Guenée
Endangered biota of New Zealand
Monotypic moth genera
Endemic moths of New Zealand